The 1985 U.S. Figure Skating Championships was held in early 1985 at Kemper Arena in Kansas City, Missouri. Medals were awarded in four colors: gold (first), silver (second), bronze (third), and pewter (fourth) in four disciplines – men's singles, ladies' singles, pair skating, and ice dancing – across three levels: senior, junior, and novice.

The event was one of the criteria used to select the U.S. teams for the 1985 World Championships.

Senior results

Men
Following the retirement of Olympic gold medalist Scott Hamilton, Brian Boitano landed seven triple jumps in the free skating to capture his first national title. Mark Cockerell, appearing in his ninth nationals, finished a career-best second, and Christopher Bowman moved up from eighth to fourth with an outstanding free skating.

Boitano would go on to capture the bronze medal at the 1985 World Championships.

(incomplete standings)

Ladies
Coming off a fourth-place finish at the 1984 Winter Olympics, Tiffany Chin was the heavy favorite and won all three phases of the competition to capture the crown. Second place finisher Debi Thomas became the first black American singles skater to qualify for the World Figure Skating Championships.

Chin would go on to win the bronze medal at the 1985 World Championships, while Thomas finished fifth in her World debut.

Pairs
After her previous partner, Burt Lancon, turned professional, 1984 Olympian Jill Watson teamed with Peter Oppegard to take the pairs crown. They were followed in second place by siblings Natalie and Wayne Seybold.

Watson and Oppegard would finish fourth in the 1985 World Championships.

(incomplete standings)

Ice dancing
Judy Blumberg / Michael Seibert won their fifth consecutive national title and would go on to earn the bronze medal at the 1985 World Championships.

(incomplete standings)

Junior results

Men

Ladies

Pairs
(incomplete standings)

Ice dancing

Novice results
Todd Eldredge and Katie Wood took gold in the novice men's and ladies' categories, respectively.

Men
(incomplete standings)

Ladies
(incomplete standings)

Pairs

Ice dancing

References

External links
 Pairs' results

U.S. Figure Skating Championships
United States Figure Skating Championships, 1985
United States Figure Skating Championships, 1985